Chaube  is a village in the Chalkusha CD block in the Barhi subdivision of the Hazaribagh district in the Indian state of Jharkhand.

Demographics
According to the 2011 Census of India, Chaube had a total population of 6,730, of which 3,528 (52%) were males and 3,202 (48%) were females. Population in the age range 0-6 years was 1,233. The total number of literate persons in Chaube was 3,814 (69.38% of the population over 6 years).

Transport
Chaube has a railway station in the Dhanbad-Koderma sector of the Grand chord.

Chaube is linked to Markacho through the Markacho-Chaube road and to Keshwari through the Chaube-Keshwari road.

References

Villages in Hazaribagh district